Wallace Township is a township in Chester County, Pennsylvania, United States. The population was 3,458 at the 2010 census.

History
The Glenmoore Historic District, William Ferguson Farm, and Springton Manor Farm are listed on the National Register of Historic Places.

Geography

Demographics

At the 2010 census, the township was 92.7% non-Hispanic White, 3.2% Black or African American, 0.1% Native American, 1.4% Asian, and 1.1% were two or more races. 1.6% of the population were of Hispanic or Latino ancestry.

At the 2000 census there were 3,240 people, 1,009 households, and 855 families living in the township.  The population density was 269.3 people per square mile (104.0/km2).  There were 1,045 housing units at an average density of 86.9/sq mi (33.5/km2).  The racial makeup of the township was 95.68% White, 2.50% African American, 0.03% Native American, 1.17% Asian, 0.06% Pacific Islander, 0.34% from other races, and 0.22% from two or more races. Hispanic or Latino of any race were 1.30%.

There were 1,009 households, 46.6% had children under the age of 18 living with them, 77.5% were married couples living together, 4.7% had a female householder with no husband present, and 15.2% were non-families. 12.0% of households were made up of individuals, and 4.3% were one person aged 65 or older.  The average household size was 3.07 and the average family size was 3.36.

The age distribution was 33.7% under the age of 18, 4.6% from 18 to 24, 28.3% from 25 to 44, 25.9% from 45 to 64, and 7.5% 65 or older.  The median age was 37 years. For every 100 females there were 106.0 males.  For every 100 females age 18 and over, there were 95.6 males.

The median household income was $86,881 and the median family income  was $95,104. Males had a median income of $65,705 versus $35,878 for females. The per capita income for the township was $33,437.  None of the families and 2.8% of the population were living below the poverty line, including no under eighteens and 23.0% of those over 64.

Education
It is in the Downingtown Area School District.

Almost all of the township is zoned to Springton Manor Elementary School while a small part is zoned to Brandywine Wallace Elementary School.

Most of the township is zoned to Downingtown Middle School and Downingtown West High School, while a small portion is zoned to Lionville Middle School and Downingtown East High School.

Transportation

The Pennsylvania Turnpike (I-76) passes through the northeastern portion of the township along a northwest-southeast alignment, but the nearest interchange is at Pennsylvania Route 100 in Uwchlan Township. Pennsylvania Route 82 follows North Manor Road along a north-south alignment through the western corner of the township. Pennsylvania Route 282 follows Creek Road along a northwest-southeast alignment next to the East Branch Brandywine Creek through the center of the township.

References

External links

Wallace Township

Townships in Chester County, Pennsylvania